Ritratto is an opera in six scenes with music by Willem Jeths and a libretto by Frank Siera. The 2020 productions were conducted by Geoffrey Paterson and directed by Marcel Sijm, with costumes by Jan Taminiau. The Dutch National Opera commissioned the work. The opera was scheduled to premiere at the Opera Forward Festival in Amsterdam on March 21, 2020, but the premiere was cancelled because of lockdown measures in the Netherlands, due to the COVID-19 pandemic in the Netherlands.

Plot
The opera describes the life story of an Italian high society icon at the time of the beginning of the First World War. The flamboyant wealthy heiress Luisa Casati stages herself as a living work of art and surrounds herself with leading artists of her time. When war breaks out, most of her friends, including her lover Gabriele D'Annunzio, become enthusiastic about the war. She distances herself from it in order to continue dedicating her life to art and ultimately sacrificed herself to her ideal.

Roles

Orchestration

The orchestral score of the opera includes the following instruments:

 clarinet in B, A and E
 bassoon
 Horn in F
 percussion (two players): glockenspiel, crotales (2 octaves), water gongs, Thai gongs, boobams, cymbals, large tamtam, tambourine, woodblock, Lion's roar, rattle , wooden box (with mallet), triangle, flexatone (high), snare drum, bass drum (with cymbal)
 harp
 piano
 string section: at least five first violins, five second violins, four violas, four celloss, two double basses
 Electronic sound effect in scene 2

Recording
An audio recording of the March 12, 2020 dress rehearsal was released on Challenge Records (1994) on October 2, 2020.

References

2020 operas
English-language operas
Operas based on real people
Operas
Operas set in the 20th century